Juniper Lake is a large lake located at the southeast corner of Lassen Volcanic National Park in the U.S. state of California. There is a campground and a ranger station located on the eastern shore of the lake, and a campground and private cabins located on the northern shore. The lake is accessible by an unpaved road from Chester.

See also
List of lakes in California

References

Lakes of California
Lakes of Lassen Volcanic National Park
Lakes of Lassen County, California
Lakes of Plumas County, California
Lakes of Northern California